The women's 200 metres at the 2012 IPC Athletics European Championships was held at Stadskanaal Stadium from 24–28 July.

Medalists
Results given by IPC Athletics.

Results

T11
Final

T12
Heats

Final

T34/52/53
Final

T35
Final

T36
Final

T37
Heats

Final

T38
Final

T44
Final

T46
Final

See also
List of IPC world records in athletics

References

200 metres
2012 in women's athletics
200 metres at the World Para Athletics European Championships